The 1947 Boston College Eagles football team was an American football team that represented Boston College as an independent during the 1947 college football season. In its fourth season under head coach Denny Myers, the team compiled a 5–4 record and outscored opponents by a total of 184 to 134. The team played its home games at Braves Field in Boston.

Schedule

References

Boston College
Boston College Eagles football seasons
Boston College Eagles football
1940s in Boston